Hoyt Bricken Corkins (born December 20, 1959 in Glenwood, Alabama) is an American professional poker player.

He has three children: Chelsei Corkins, Brittney Corkins, and Ashley Roundtre. Known for his softly-spoken voice and his aggressive style, Corkins has two World Series of Poker bracelets and two World Poker Tour titles.

Early life 

He started playing at the age of 19 after receiving lessons from his father. He is often known by his nickname "Cowboy" as he always wears a cowboy hat and boots to the table. However, he has been given other nicknames, including "Mr. Move All-In" by Phil Hellmuth Jr. Many players also call him "Nightmare".  He often wears a pair of ear plugs while playing in live poker tournaments in order to prevent other players' chatter from affecting his game.

World Series of Poker 

Corkins won a World Series of Poker bracelet and $96,000 for winning the 1992 $5,000 Pot Limit Omaha tournament. In total, he has finished in the money on 26 occasions.

In November 2005, Corkins finished second to Mike Matusow in the World Series of Poker Tournament of Champions freeroll, receiving $325,000.

In the 2007 World Series of Poker, Corkins won the $2,500 6 Handed No Limit Hold Em event, defeating Terrence Chan and winning over $515,000, in addition to the championship bracelet.

At the 2008 World Series of Poker Main Event, Corkins finished in 162nd place out of 6,844 entries, earning him $41,816.

World Series of Poker bracelets

Reappearance into poker 

After the win in 1992, Corkins disappeared from the game for 11 years whilst going through a divorce. He was encouraged to return to poker by his ex-fiancée Natalie, and resurfaced in 2003, taking a then record-breaking first prize ($1,089,200) in the World Poker Tour 2003 World Poker Finals. He also had a second-place finish to Gus Hansen in early 2004 at the PokerStars Caribbean Poker Adventure, which earned him $290,065. Corkins was sick from flu during the event, but he says it did not affect his play. Also in 2004, he made the final table at the United States Poker Championship main event held at the Taj Mahal in Atlantic City, NJ.

Away from the poker circuit, Corkins has sixty head of cattle to tend in Alabama and also has a home in Las Vegas.

World Poker Tour 
In 2006, he made another World Poker Tour (WPT) final table in the Season V Legends of Poker event, finishing 3rd.

In 2008, in the Season VI of the WPT's World Poker Open WPT Corkins finished second winning $458,267.

In December 2008, during Season VII of the WPT Corkins made the final table of the Doyle Brunson Five Diamond World Poker Classic and finished in 6th place, earning $216,175.

In January 2010, Hoyt made another World Poker Tour final table at the Southern Poker Championship, and took home the first place prize of $739,486.

As of 2019, his live tournament winnings exceed $6,000,000. His 26 cashes at the WSOP account for $1,017,074 of those winnings.

References

External links
 Official site
 Blind Bet Poker interview

American poker players
Living people
People from Crenshaw County, Alabama
World Poker Tour winners
World Series of Poker bracelet winners
Super Bowl of Poker event winners
1959 births